Hirokazu Ibata (Japanese:井端 弘和, born May 12, 1975) is a Japanese former professional baseball player in the Nippon Professional Baseball (NPB). He played second base for the Yomiuri Giants and short stop for the Chunichi Dragons but is able to play at other positions.

After retiring at the end of the 2015 season, Ibata took up new Giants' manager, Yoshinobu Takahashi's invitation to join his coaching staff.

References

External links

 
 

1975 births
Living people
Asia University (Japan) alumni
Baseball designated hitters
Chunichi Dragons players
Japanese baseball coaches
Japanese baseball players
Nippon Professional Baseball coaches
Nippon Professional Baseball infielders
People from Kawasaki, Kanagawa
Yomiuri Giants players
2013 World Baseball Classic players